Libvisual is an abstraction library that fits between applications and audio visualisation plugins.

Often when it comes to audio visualization plugins or programs that create visuals, they depend on a player or something else; basically, there was no general framework that enabled application developers to easily access interesting audio visualization plugins. Libvisual wanted to change this by providing an interface towards plugins and applications; through this interface, applications can  access plugins. Since the drawing is done by the application, it also enables the developer to draw the visual anywhere desired.

Currently libvisual is mainly focused on Unix-like systems including FreeBSD, Linux, and NetBSD.

The goal is to make libvisual a cross-platform audio visualisation framework.

Other examples of audio visualization programs are Winamp Advanced Visualization Studio and MilkDrop.

Libvisual is released under the LPGL-2.1-or-later and included in every major linux distribution.

Media Players that support libvisual:
 Amarok
 XMMS2
 Beep Media Player
 BMPx
 LiVES Video Editing System
 Rhythmbox
 Trinity-amarok (revival of Amarok 1.4)

Libraries supporting libvisual:
 Gstreamer
 Gmerlin

History 
 Libvisual 0.5.0 	due by mid 2014
 Libvisual 0.4.0 	2006-03-20
 Libvisual 0.2.0 	2005-02-08
 Libvisual 0.1.7 	2004-10-14
 Libvisual 0.1.6 	2004-09-08
 Libvisual 0.1.5 	2004-06-28
 Libvisual 0.1.4 	2004-06-16
 Libvisual 0.1.3 	2004-05-27

See also
List of free software for audio

External links
 Libvisual Home
 Libvisual Wiki

Music visualization software
C (programming language) libraries
Cross-platform software